Rufat Mahomedov (born 6 May 1992) is a Ukrainian Paralympic judoka. He won one of the bronze medals in the men's 73 kg event at the 2020 Summer Paralympics held in Tokyo, Japan.

References 

Living people
1992 births
Ukrainian male judoka
Paralympic judoka of Ukraine
Paralympic bronze medalists for Ukraine
Paralympic medalists in judo
Judoka at the 2020 Summer Paralympics
Medalists at the 2020 Summer Paralympics
Place of birth missing (living people)
20th-century Ukrainian people
21st-century Ukrainian people